National nature reserves in Cambridgeshire, England are established by Natural England and managed by them or by non-governmental organisations such as the Royal Society for the Protection of Birds or the National Trust.

List of reserves 
A list of national nature reserves in Cambridge:
 Barnack Hills & Holes NNR,  near Stamford
 Bedford Purlieus NNR,  near Kings Cliffe
 Castor Hanglands NNR,  near Peterborough
 Chippenham Fen NNR,  near Newmarket
 Holme Fen NNR,  near Ramsey
 Monks Wood NNR,  near Sawtry
 Upwood Meadows NNR,  near Ramsey
 Wicken Fen NNR,  near Soham
 Woodwalton Fen NNR,  near Ramsey

See also
List of Sites of Special Scientific Interest in Cambridgeshire
List of Local Nature Reserves in Cambridgeshire

References 

 Cambridgeshire
Nature reserves in Cambridgeshire